Higashikurumeshi Chikurin Park is a bamboo grove with natural spring water. It is located in Higashikurume, Tokyo. It was created by taking advantage of the natural shape of the land, and there is a path through the bamboo grove. The park has over 2,000 bamboo trees.

It was constructed in 1974 and was selected as one of the 100 New Tokyo Views in 1983.

Gallery

References

External links
City website park introduction 

Parks and gardens in Tokyo
Coordinates not on Wikidata
Forests of Japan